This is a list of the National Register of Historic Places listings in Buffalo National River.

This is intended to be a complete list of the properties and districts on the National Register of Historic Places in Buffalo National River, Arkansas, United States.  The locations of National Register properties and districts for which the latitude and longitude coordinates are included below, may be seen in a Google map.

There are eight properties and districts listed on the National Register in the park.

Current listings 

|--
|}

See also 
 Calf Creek site
 National Register of Historic Places listings in Marion County, Arkansas
 National Register of Historic Places listings in Newton County, Arkansas
 National Register of Historic Places listings in Arkansas

References 

Buffalo National River
Buffalo National River
Arkansas-related lists
Buffalo National River